Marcia Lynne "Marcheline" Bertrand (May 9, 1950 – January 27, 2007) was an American actress. She was the former wife of actor Jon Voight, and the mother of actress Angelina Jolie and actor James Haven.

Early life 
Born at St. Francis Hospital in Blue Island, Illinois, Bertrand was brought up in the nearby small town of Riverdale. Her parents were Lois June (née Gouwens) and Rolland F. Bertrand. She had two younger siblings: a sister, Debbie, and a brother, Raleigh. In 1965, Bertrand's family moved from the Chicago area to Beverly Hills, California, where she attended Beverly Hills High School from sophomore year through graduation.

Bertrand's father was of French-Canadian descent, and her mother was of Dutch and German ancestry, with ancestors who had immigrated to the United States in the mid-19th century. Bertrand claimed to be of Iroquois ancestry through her father's line, although her only known Native American ancestor is a Huron woman born in 1649 in present-day Quebec. According to her daughter, Bertrand was often wrongly identified as a French actress because of her stage name; she said, "My mom is as far from French Parisian as you can get. She grew up in a bowling alley that my grandparents owned."

Film career 
During her early years as an actress, Bertrand studied with Lee Strasberg. In 1971, she played Connie in the episode "Love, Peace, Brotherhood and Murder" on the fourth season of the television show Ironside. A decade later, she appeared in a minor role in 1982's Lookin' to Get Out, a film co-written by and starring her former husband, Jon Voight. The following year, Bertrand played her final film role in the 1983 comedy The Man Who Loved Women, a remake of the 1977 French film of the same name.

Bertrand then turned her attention toward producing. In 1983, she founded Woods Road Productions with her then-partner, Bill Day. In 2005, Bertrand was the executive producer of the documentary Trudell, which chronicles the life and work of her partner, John Trudell, a Santee Sioux musician and activist. Trudell was an official selection at the Sundance Film Festival and the Tribeca Film Festival, and it won the Special Jury Prize for Best Documentary at the Seattle International Film Festival.

Humanitarian work 
Bertrand and her partner, John Trudell, founded the All Tribes Foundation, to support the cultural and economic survival of Native peoples. By 2007, the foundation had issued over $800,000 in grants to reservation-based programs that strengthen tribal ways of life and safeguard a future for Native communities.

On International Women's Day in 2003, Bertrand and Trudell produced a benefit concert for Afghan women refugees in conjunction with the United Nations High Commissioner for Refugees.

Bertrand, who was diagnosed with ovarian cancer in 1999, also founded the Give Love Give Life organization with Trudell; their objective was to raise public consciousness about ovarian and other gynecological cancers through music. The first Give Love Give Life concert was held in February 2004 at The Roxy in West Hollywood. Bertrand and Trudell worked to organize strategic support in the music and film community for Johanna's Law, legislation to fund national outreach and education about the signs and symptoms of gynecological cancers, which was signed into law on January 12, 2007. To benefit the Women's Cancer Research Institute at Cedars-Sinai Medical Center, a second Give Love Give Life concert was held at the Gibson Amphitheater in Los Angeles in February 2007, a month after Bertrand died from cancer.

Personal life 
Bertrand married actor Jon Voight on December 12, 1971. Following a miscarriage in 1972, they had two children, James Haven and Angelina Jolie. Both children became actors. Bertrand and Voight separated in 1976, publicly citing Voight's adultery. Bertrand filed for divorce in 1978, which was finalized in 1980.

Following her legal separation from Voight, Bertrand began a relationship with documentary filmmaker Bill Day. They lived together for eleven years but never married. During her later life, Bertrand was in a relationship with activist and musician John Trudell.

At the time of her death, Bertrand had three grandchildren by her daughter. Another granddaughter, who was born the following year, was given the middle name "Marcheline" in her honor.

Bertrand was Roman Catholic.

Death 
Toward the end of her life, Bertrand preferred her privacy and did not grant interviews. After a nearly eight-year battle with ovarian and breast cancer, she died aged 56 on January 27, 2007, at Cedars-Sinai Medical Center, in the company of her children. Bertrand's mother and sister also died of cancer. Her daughter explained, "My grandmother also died young; so, my mother always thought it could happen to her."

Filmography

References

External links 
 
 
 Marcheline Bertrand memorial page
 Marcheline Bertrand's will
 Official site of Give Love Give Life 

1950 births
2007 deaths
American film actresses
Film producers from Illinois
American people of French-Canadian descent
American people of Dutch descent
American people of German descent
Deaths from cancer in California
Deaths from ovarian cancer
People from Blue Island, Illinois
Voight family
20th-century American actresses
American television actresses
People from Riverdale, Illinois
20th-century Roman Catholics
21st-century Roman Catholics
Catholics from Illinois
American women film producers
21st-century American women